General Fuchs may refer to:

Georg Fuchs (general) (1856―1939), Prussian General of the Infantry
Robert Fuchs (general) (1895–1977), German Luftwaffe major general
Yehuda Fuchs (born 1969), Israel Defense Forces major general